David Ungerer (born September 16, 1995) is a professional Canadian football wide receiver for the Toronto Argonauts of the Canadian Football League (CFL). He played college football at Idaho.

College career
Ungerer played college football with the Idaho Vandals from 2014 to 2018.

Professional career

Hamilton Tiger-Cats
Ungerer was drafted in the second round, 11th overall by the Hamilton Tiger-Cats in the 2019 CFL Draft and he signed with the team on May 17, 2019. He played in his first career CFL game on August 10, 2019 against the BC Lions. He then recorded his first reception the next week on August 17, 2019 against the Ottawa Redblacks. For the season, he played in 10 regular season games as a rookie where he had two catches for 44 yards. He spent the post-season on the injured list and did not play in the Tiger-Cats' 107th Grey Cup loss.

Due to the cancellation of the 2020 CFL season, Ungerer did not play in 2020. He became a regular starter with the Tiger-Cats in 2021 and scored his first career touchdown on a 23-yard catch from Dane Evans in the Labour Day Classic against the Toronto Argonauts on September 6, 2021. He became a free agent upon the expiry of his contract on February 14, 2023.

Toronto Argonauts
On March 9, 2023, it was announced that Ungerer had signed with the Toronto Argonauts.

References

External links
 Toronto Argonauts bio

1995 births
Living people
Canadian football wide receivers
Hamilton Tiger-Cats players
Idaho Vandals football players
Players of American football from Washington (state)
People from Pullman, Washington
Toronto Argonauts players